Udrežnje is a village in the municipality of Nevesinje, Republika Srpska, Bosnia and Herzegovina.

According to the 2013 census, there are 189 inhabitants.

On June 2, 1941, Franjo Sudar's Ustaše attacked the Udrežnje village and killed 27 people of the Vujadinović, Vukosav, Dragović, Gambelić, Kljakić, Šipovac, Šakota and Škipina families.

References

Populated places in Nevesinje
Villages in Republika Srpska